Kallima philarchus, the Ceylon blue oakleaf, is a nymphalid butterfly found in Sri Lanka. With wings closed, it closely resembles a dry leaf with dark veins and is a spectacular example of camouflage.

References

Kallimini
Butterflies of Asia
Butterflies described in 1848
Taxa named by John O. Westwood